HMS Sealion was a second-batch S-class submarine built during the 1930s for the Royal Navy. Completed in 1934, the boat fought in the Second World War.

Design and description
The second batch of S-class submarines were designed as slightly improved and enlarged versions of the earlier boats of the class and were intended to operate in the North and Baltic Seas. They displaced  on the surface and  submerged. The S-class submarines had a crew of 40 officers and ratings.

For surface running, the boats were powered by two  diesel engines, each driving one propeller shaft. When submerged each propeller was driven by a  electric motor. They could reach  on the surface and  underwater.

The S-class boats were armed with six  torpedo tubes in the bow. They carried six reload torpedoes for a total of a dozen torpedoes. They were also armed with a 3-inch (76 mm) deck gun.

Construction and career
Ordered on 23 December 1932, Sealion was laid down on 16 May 1933 in Cammell Laird's shipyard in Birkenhead and was launched on 16 March 1934. The boat was completed on 21 December.

She had an eventful career after the outbreak of war. Her first success was the German merchant , sunk in April 1940 off the Danish island of Anholt. She later attacked the German merchant Moltkefels, but failed to hit her. She fired upon the beached Palime, and unsuccessfully attacked  in July 1940. She finished her patrol by sinking the Norwegian merchant Toran and attacking but failing to sink the German merchant Cläre Hugo Stinnes in August.

On 5 February 1941 she shelled and sank the Norwegian Hurtigruten cargo-passenger ship . In May of that year Sealion unsuccessfully attacked . In July she attacked French shipping, sinking the French fishing vessels Gustav Eugene and Gustav Jeanne, and on succeeding days, Christus Regnat and St Pierre d'Alcantara.

She was one of a number of submarines ordered to track the  before her eventual sinking.

Towards the end of 1941 she sank the Norwegian tanker Vesco and the Norwegian merchant .

She was scuttled as an ASDIC target off the Isle of Arran on 13 March 1945.

Citations

References
 
 
 
 
 
 
 

 

British S-class submarines (1931)
Shipwrecks in the Firth of Clyde
Ships built on the River Mersey
1934 ships
World War II submarines of the United Kingdom
Scuttled vessels
Maritime incidents in March 1945